El Rey del Valle is a drama television series created by Juan Camilo Ferrand, and produced by Sony Pictures Television and Claro Video, that premiered on Claro Video on 23 August 2018. The series will stars Osvaldo Benavides, Daniel Tovar, and Paulina Gaitán.

Principal photography began on 24 January 2018, and the series will consist of two seasons each of thirteen episodes.

Cast 
 Osvaldo Benavides as Luis Miguel del Valle
 Daniel Tovar as José Édgar "Joed" Contreras
 Biassini Segura as Wilmer Camacho
 Paulina Gaitán as Margarita Guzmán
 Eduardo Victoria as Alejandro del Valle
 Laura Perico as Anabel del Valle
 Matías Moreno as Vitorín del Valle
 Héctor Holten as Emiliano Guzmán
 Lauren Emilia Ceballos as Xochitl
 Samadhi Zendejas as Chayo

References

External links 
 

2010s American drama television series
Mexican drama television series
Spanish-language television shows
2018 Mexican television series debuts
2018 American television series debuts
Claro Video original programming
Sony Pictures Television telenovelas